Bortondale is an unincorporated community in Middletown Township in Delaware County, Pennsylvania, United States. Bortondale is located along Bortondale Road west of Ridley Creek.

References

Unincorporated communities in Delaware County, Pennsylvania
Unincorporated communities in Pennsylvania